Carine Eyenga Abani (born 14 February 1983) is a Cameroonian sprinter. She competed in the women's 4 × 100 metres relay at the 2000 Summer Olympics.

References

External links
 

1983 births
Living people
Athletes (track and field) at the 2000 Summer Olympics
Cameroonian female sprinters
Olympic athletes of Cameroon
Place of birth missing (living people)
Olympic female sprinters
21st-century Cameroonian women